Luigi Musso (28 July 1924 – 6 July 1958) was an Italian racing driver. In 1955 he joined the Ferrari team, entering into a fierce rivalry with Mike Hawthorn and Peter Collins, which boosted the performance of the team, but also encouraged greater risk-taking. According to Musso's fiancée, he was deep in debt by the time of the lucrative 1958 French Grand Prix, where he was fatally injured, somersaulting into a ditch while chasing Hawthorn.

Racing career
Musso was born in Rome and began his racing career driving sports cars before making his début on the Formula One circuit on 17 January 1954, driving a Maserati. In 1954 he won the Coppa Acerbo, a non-championship Formula One race. At Zandvoort, in the 1955 Dutch Grand Prix, Musso placed third in a Maserati. At the end of the 1955 Formula 1 season he switched to Ferrari. He shared victory in the 1956 Argentine Grand Prix with Juan Manuel Fangio, however his season was cut short after a crash in a sports car race at Nürburgring.

Musso triumphed in a Ferrari 290 MM in the City of Buenos Aires sports car race on 20 January 1957. He was the third driver of the car. Stirling Moss finished second in a 'light powered' Maserati 300S. Moss made a last-ditch effort for his team at the end but came up short. A second Ferrari 290 MM, driven by Eugenio Castellotti, came in third. The Ferrari team gained eight points toward the 1957 World Sports Car Championship in the event. The same year he won the Grand Prix de la Marne. Although the Marne was also not part of the Drivers' Championship, Musso nevertheless finished third in the overall standings for the season.  With Olivier Gendebien he won the 1958 Targa Florio driving a Ferrari Testa Rossa.  Later in the year he shared a 4-litre modified Formula One Ferrari 412 MI with Phil Hill and Mike Hawthorn in the 2nd Race of Two Worlds on the Monza banked oval.  They finished 3rd overall in a car that gave way to the purpose-built American oval-track racing cars.

Death
Musso was fatally injured during the 1958 French Grand Prix at Reims when his Ferrari hurtled off the course on the 10th lap of the 50 lap race. Running wide at the tricky Gueux Curve while chasing the leader, fellow Ferrari driver Mike Hawthorn, Musso's Ferrari struck a ditch and somersaulted.  Musso was airlifted to hospital with critical head injuries and died later that day. Hawthorn went on to win the race.

Rivalry with Hawthorn and Collins
Many years after Musso's death, Fiamma Breschi, Musso's girlfriend at the time of his death, revealed the nature of Musso's rivalry with fellow team Ferrari drivers Mike Hawthorn and Collins in a television documentary, The Secret Life of Enzo Ferrari. Breschi recalled that the antagonism between Musso and the two English drivers, Mike Hawthorn and Peter Collins, encouraged all three to take more risks. She said: "The Englishmen (Hawthorn and Collins) had an agreement. Whichever of them won, they would share the winnings equally. It was the two of them against Luigi, who was not part of the agreement. Strength comes in numbers, and they were united against him. This antagonism was actually favourable rather than damaging to Ferrari. The faster the drivers went, the more likely it was that a Ferrari would win."  Breschi related that at the time of his death, Musso was in debt, and thus winning the French Grand Prix (traditionally the largest monetary prize of the season) was all-important to him.

Within a year, Collins and Hawthorn were also dead, and Breschi could not suppress a feeling of release. "I had hated them both," she said, "first because I was aware of certain facts that were not right, and also because when I came out of the hospital and went back to the hotel, I found them in the square outside the hotel, laughing and playing a game of football with an empty beer-can. So when they died, too, it was liberating for me. Otherwise I would have had unpleasant feelings towards them for ever. This way I could find a sense of peace."

Racing achievements
During his F1 career, Luigi Musso won one World Championship Grand Prix, achieved 7 podiums, and scored a total of 44 championship points.

Racing record

Complete World Drivers' Championship results
(key) (Races in italics indicate fastest lap)

* Shared drive with Sergio Mantovani.
† Shared drive with Sergio Mantovani and Harry Schell.
‡ Shared drive with Juan Manuel Fangio.

Non-Championship results
(key) (Races in bold indicate pole position)
(Races in italics indicate fastest lap)

References

1924 births
1958 deaths
Italian Formula One drivers
Maserati Formula One drivers
Ferrari Formula One drivers
Formula One race winners
Italian racing drivers
Racing drivers who died while racing
Racing drivers from Rome
Sport deaths in France
24 Hours of Le Mans drivers
World Sportscar Championship drivers